The Toxic Touch is God Dethroned's seventh studio album.

Track listing
 "Faithless" (Sattler) – 0:36
 "Hating Life" (Sattler) – 4:08
 "2014" (Delahaye, Sattler, VanWeesenbeek) – 4:06
 "Falling Down" (Delahaye) – 3:36
 "On Wings of Pestilence" (Delahaye, Sattler) – 5:01
 "The Day You Died" (Delahaye, Sattler) – 4:04
 "Away from Emptiness" (Delahaye, Sattler) – 3:05
 "Macabre World" (Delahaye, Sattler) – 4:04
 "Typhoid Mary" (Delahaye, Sattler, VanWeesenbeek) – 5:49
 "Fail to Exist" (Delahaye, Sattler, VanWeesenbeek) – 4:43

References

2006 albums
God Dethroned albums